Liu Chuang (Chinese: 刘闯, pinyin: Liú Chuǎng, born 6 June 1990) is a Chinese former professional snooker player.

Early life
Liu grew up in Liaoning province in northeast China. Near his parents' house there was a snooker table and when he was 10 he played on it and liked it a lot. His father noticed his potential, and supported him as did the person who owned that table, who became his first coach.

When he was 13, Liu travelled thousands of miles to play in southern China, where there were more professionals. There he improved and began to play competitive matches. In 2007, the chairman of the Asian Snooker Association saw his potential, and he gained a wild card in the China Open.

Career

Junior 
In 2005, Liu was a runner-up in a national junior tournament in China. In 2006, Liu reached the final of a senior national tournament.

Senior 
Liu first came to the attention of the snooker world when he was picked as a wildcard to enter the 2007 China Open. Liu was victorious over Andy Hicks, beating him 5–4. That set up a meeting with Liu's idol, Ronnie O'Sullivan; Liu lost the match 1–5.

He reached the quarter-finals of the 2007 Asian Snooker Championship, where he lost 4–5 to Yasin Merchant.

In the 2008 World Championship he qualified for the main stage, He beat Colin Mitchell 10–0, Lee Walker 10–9 Joe Delaney 10–5, David Gray 10–5, and then Dominic Dale 10–9 to become only the fourth 17-year-old player to qualify for the Crucible after Stephen Hendry, Ronnie O'Sullivan and Judd Trump. Liu was drawn to play O'Sullivan in the first round. Despite being 0–3 down, Liu came back in the first session and levelled at 4–4, before O'Sullivan eventually won the game 10–5. Liu was relegated from the Main Tour after the following season.

On 15 April 2010, he won the Asian Under 21 Snooker Championship, defeating Thanawat Tirapaipongboon 10–5 in the final. With this he qualified for the 2010/2011 professional Main Tour.

2011/2012 season
Liu began the season ranked world number 60, meaning he would need to win three qualifying matches to reach the main stage of the ranking event tournaments. He did not achieve this until the final and biggest tournament on the snooker calendar, the World Championship. He beat Rod Lawler 10–7, Jimmy White 10–8 and Jamie Cope 10–7 to reach the Crucible for the second time in his career. Liu was one of five Asian players to make it to the event, which was a new record. He played two-time world champion Mark Williams in the first round and was beaten 6–10, to finish the season ranked number 56, inside the top 64 who automatically retained their places for the 2012–13 season.

2012/2013 season

The 2012–13 season proved to be less successful for Liu as he failed to qualify for any of the ranking events. He played in seven of the ten minor-ranking Players Tour Championship events with his best finish coming in the last two European Tour tournaments, where he lost in the last 32 in both. He was ranked 72nd on the PTC Order of Merit. Liu's season ended when he lost in the second round of World Championship Qualifying 9–10 to Dechawat Poomjaeng, which saw him placed world number 54 in the rankings.

2013/2014 season

Liu received first round entry into the UK Championship and Welsh Open as all 128 players on the snooker tour began at the venue stage. It was at these events where Liu won his only matches in ranking events this season. In the UK he beat Tony Drago 6–1, before losing 6–5 against Robert Milkins and at the Welsh he saw off Chen Zhe 4–2, but was then whitewashed 4–0 by Joe Perry.
Chuang reached two quarter-finals in Asian Tour events during the 2013–14 season, at the Yixing Open and Zhengzhou Open, losing 4–0 to Mark Selby and 4–2 to Liang Wenbo respectively. Chuang finished outside of the top 64 in the world rankings and would have been relegated from the tour; however, his placing of 12th on the Asian Order of Merit saw him earn a fresh two-year card for the 2014–15 and 2015–16 seasons by claiming the third of four spots available to non-qualified players.

2014/2015 season
Liu entered the qualifying rounds of three ranking events this season and lost his first match in each. His only wins came at the Yixing Open where he beat Michael Tomlinson and Wang Heng, before losing 4–0 to Li Hang in the last 32. Liu has not played in an event since October 2014.

Chinese 8 Ball
Liu made it to the final of the 2016 World Chinese 8 Ball Masters and lost to Yang Fan 12–9. The match was a best of 25 race to 13, but the 110 minute time limit ran out.

Performance and rankings timeline

Career finals

Amateur finals: 1 (1 title)

References

External links

 
 
 Global Snooker Profile

1990 births
Living people
Chinese snooker players
Sportspeople from Liaoning
21st-century Chinese people